Camino nuevo is a Spanish phrase meaning "New highway."  The term is used in shorthand for several facilities:
Camino Nuevo Charter Academy
Camino Nuevo Correctional Center, Albuquerque NM

Other
 Camino Nuevo, a barrio in Yabucoa, Puerto Rico